The Warr Guitar is an American-made touch guitar, a type of instrument that combines both bass and melodic strings on a single fretboard. Invented by Mark Warr, a musician from Thousand Oaks, California, it is related to the Chapman Stick, another two-handed tapping instrument. The Warr guitar is designed for either two-handed tapping or strumming. Warr guitars have between seven and 14 strings.

Perhaps the best known Warr guitar players are Trey Gunn, formerly of the progressive rock band King Crimson, and Colin Marston of Behold... The Arctopus.

References

External links
 

Fretboard tapping instruments